Midway Bridge near Johnstown, North Dakota is the only bedstead bridge known to have been built in North Dakota. It appears to have been built locally, not as part of a state or county program, during the 1920-1930 period. 
Also known as Bedstead Bridge, it is a Warren Bedstead-type truss bridge.

References

External links
 

Road bridges on the National Register of Historic Places in North Dakota
National Register of Historic Places in Grand Forks County, North Dakota
Bedstead truss bridges
Warren truss bridges in the United States
Transportation in Grand Forks County, North Dakota
Bridges completed in the 1920s
1924 establishments in North Dakota